Mongolia sent 6 athletes to compete at the 2008 Summer Paralympics in Beijing, People's Republic of China.

Medalists
The country won one medal, a gold. It was Mongolia's first ever Paralympic medal.

Sports

Archery

Men

|-
|align=left|Dambadondogiin Baatarjav
|align=left|Men's individual recurve standing
|618
|6
|Bye
|W 104-91
|W 106-104
|W 105-98
|W 94-90
|
|}

Women

|-
|align=left|Byambasuren Javzmaa
|align=left|Women's individual recurve standing
|563
|7
|Bye
|L 85-90
|colspan=4|Did not advance
|}

Judo

Shooting

See also
Mongolia at the Paralympics
Mongolia at the 2008 Summer Olympics

References

External links
International Paralympic Committee

Nations at the 2008 Summer Paralympics
2008
Summer Paralympics